The following are the telephone codes in Ethiopia.

Calling formats
 xxx xxxx - calling within an area code
 0yy xxx xxxx - calling within Ethiopia
 +251 yy xxx xxxx - calling from outside Ethiopia
The NSN length is nine digits.

Mobile numbers start with 91.

091 XXX-XXXX - domestic calling

+251 91 XXX-XXXX - from overseas

List of area codes in Ethiopia

Area codes were revised in 2005. The new area codes are as shown below.

Numbering plan for PSTN services in Addis Ababa and its surroundings

Numbering plan for WLL services in Addis Ababa

Numbering plan for PSTN services in Regions

South-East Region

North-East Region

North Region

Eastern Region

South Region

South Western Region

Western Region

North Western Region

References

Ethiopia
Telecommunications in Ethiopia
Telephone numbers